Yiqing Yin (born 1985) is a Chinese-born, Paris-based Haute Couture designer and an official member of the Chambre Syndicale de la Haute Couture.

Early life 

Yin was born in Beijing in 1985, and moved to France with her family at the age of 4. She studied at the École nationale supérieure des arts décoratifs in Paris. After graduating she completed an internship at French brand Cacharel and was a clasher for 1.5 years.

Fashion career 

In 2010, Yin was invited to present her first collection "Exile" at the Hyères International Festival, which won her the Grand Prize of Creation from the city of Paris and the Andam Prize for First Collection.  These early creations were later displayed in the windows of French Ministère de la Culture and at the Théâtre National de Chaillot in Paris. In July 2011 following her second collection Ouvrir Venus, Yin was invited to be a guest member of Chambre Syndicale de la Haute Couture by Didier Grumbach the Director of French Federation of Couture. Yin now shows her collections during the Paris Fashion Week.  In 2015, Yin became one of the 14 official members of the Chambre Syndicale de la Haute Couture.

In 2014, Yin is the creative director of French brand Léonard, with her first ready-to-wear show.

References

External links
 
 http://www.modeaparis.com/fr/defiles/calendriers/Haute-couture,37 
 http://couturenotebook.com/2012/07/20/yiqing-yin-the-interview/
 http://couturetroopers.com/2012/12/06/interview-parisian-haute-couturier-yiqing-yin-creates-magic-in-details-at-french-couture-week-2012/
 http://en.vogue.fr/fashion-videos/fashion-story/videos/a-day-with-yiqing-yin/1708
 http://www.swarovski-elements.com/magazine/issue02/Yiqing-Yin/yiqing-yin.en.html
 http://en.vogue.fr/defiles/fall-winter-2013-2014-paris-yiqing-yin/9048/diaporama/show-947/12719/pag
 http://www.absolut.com/en/collaborations/yiqing-yin/

1985 births
Living people
French fashion designers
French women fashion designers
Chinese fashion designers
Chinese women fashion designers
Chinese emigrants to France
Artists from Beijing
Haute couture
Naturalized citizens of France